Camilo is both a given name and a surname. Notable people with the name include:

Given name
 Camilo Albornoz (born 2000), Argentine footballer
 Camilo Cascolan (born 1964), Filipino law enforcement officer
 Camilo Castelo Branco, Portuguese writer
 Camilo Cienfuegos, Cuban revolutionary 
Camilo Doval (born 1997), Dominican baseball relief pitcher for the San Francisco Giants
 Camilo Echeverry, Colombian singer who records under the mononym "Camilo"
 Camilo Egas, Ecuadorian painter
 Camilo Gómez, Colombian cyclist
 Camilo Henríquez, Chilean priest, author and politician
 Camilo José Cela, Spanish Nobel prize winner
 Camilo Romero, Mexican footballer
 Camilo Sanvezzo, usually referred to simply as Camilo, Brazilian footballer
 Camilo Torres Restrepo, Colombian Roman Catholic priest
 Camilo Villegas, Colombian golfer
 Camilo Wong "Chino" Moreno, American musician, lead-vocalist of alternative metal band Deftones
 Camilo (footballer, born 22 March 1986), Camilo de Sousa Vieira, Brazilian football goalkeeper

Surname
 Fernando Camilo Farias, commonly known as Camilo, Brazilian footballer
 Francisco Camilo, Spanish painter
 Janet Camilo (born 1971), Dominican lawyer and politician
 Michel Camilo, Dominican jazz-Latin pianist and composer
 Tiago Camilo (born 1982), Brazilian judoka
 Wallace Camilo, Brazilian footballer

See also
 Camillo (disambiguation)
 Camila (disambiguation)

Portuguese masculine given names
Spanish masculine given names